Roy Lucas may refer to:

 Roy Lucas (American football), American football coach
 Roy Lucas (lawyer) (1941–2003), legal theorist and abortion rights activist